Northwest Florida Beaches International Airport  is a public airport  northwest of Panama City, Florida, United States, in Bay County. The airport is owned by the Panama City-Bay County Airport & Industrial District, and is north of Panama City Beach, near West Bay. It replaced Panama City–Bay County International Airport (Fannin Field, PFN), which was located in Panama City.

The airport opened for commercial flights on May 23, 2010, and is the first international airport in the United States designed and built since the September 11 attacks. The airport currently has no scheduled international flights, due to the small population in the surrounding areas and the fact that the demand for visitation to Panama City is mostly regional and/or national. The airport authority originally decided to name it Northwest Florida–Panama City International Airport, but airlines and the general public asked the airport authority to use a more regional name.

History
In the late 1990s, the Panama City-Bay County Airport and Industrial District (Airport Authority) started looking for ways to increase the air service in the Panama City area. The old airport had been built in 1932, with scheduled service beginning in 1948. However, it did not have enough room to expand. Proposed ideas included using the current airport property and extending the current short runways into St. Andrews Bay or into residential neighborhoods, relocation of the airport to a new site, or collocation with Tyndall AFB. With strong opposition to extending the runways into an environmentally sensitive bay or into neighborhoods, the airport authority began to search for relocation sites. The authority received tentative approval to build a new airport in northwestern Bay County in 2001. In 2005–2007 the authority obtained the needed permits.

The relocation of the airport was controversial in Bay County. The county commission chose to proceed with building a new airport and closing down Fannin Field despite a majority of voters in a non-binding 2004 referendum voting against the plan. Some felt that the St. Joe Company, which owned the land the airport would be based on, would derive an unfair benefit at the taxpayers' expense. Suits were filed against the airport on environmental grounds but were not successful in halting its construction. Construction was completed in May 2010, however the planned crosswind runway was not built. This controversy continues as of May 2021.

The airport's IATA code was originally supposed to be TFB, for "The Florida Beaches". However, this code was already taken by the Tifalmin Airport in Papua New Guinea. By going through all available IATA codes, the group deciding the code came across ECP. After jokingly saying it could stand for "Everyone Can Party", the code stuck.

Facilities

Runway
Runway 16/34 is the only runway. There are plans to build one crosswind and one parallel runway as traffic increases.

The runway has a 4-aligned PAPI light system (glideslope: 2.83°), a MALSR approach lighting system, centerline lights, and touchdown zone lights. The runway has an instrument approach which includes S-ILS or LOC/DME, and GPS RNAV. For general aviation aircraft, the runway uses left traffic pattern.

This runway has a 4-aligned PAPI light system (glideslope: 2.83°) and centerline lights. This runway has a GPS RNAV or LOC/DME instrument approach. For general aviation aircraft, the runway uses left traffic pattern.

Terminal

The new airport has a much larger terminal, designed by HNTB, compared to the terminal at the previous airport. The terminal, 105,000 sq. feet, has seven gates. Gates 1–5 have jet bridges, while Gates 6 and 7 are on ramp level for regional aircraft. The airport has a US Customs and Border Protection inspection facility for arriving international flights. It was anticipated that the new terminal building will be the first airport terminal to attain a LEED rating for being a green building as well. As of July 2011, it has yet to receive this. A new terminal building at Appleton International Airport has since become the first LEED-rated terminal building in the world.

General aviation
General aviation is handled at the general aviation facility south of the main passenger terminal. 111 GA aircraft were based at the airport in January 2018. 84 are single-engine, 16 are multi-engine, 10 are jets, and 1 helicopter. There are no gliders or ultra-lights based at the airport. As of 2012, 75% of based aircraft belong to corporations. About 75% of GA operations are business/corporate related, 65% of which are business jets.
The only FBO as of August 2011 is SheltAir. Flight training based at KECP has fallen off as ATP Flight School closed prior to the relocation of the airport. Island Air Express and Precision Flight Training, LLC now offer flight training.

Air cargo
The cargo facility is between the control tower and general aviation ramp. Flight Express is the primary air cargo service to KECP.

Aircraft operations
In the 12-month period ending February 28, 2018, the airport had 67,121 aircraft operations, average 184 per day: 55% general aviation, 25% military, 12% airline, and 8% air taxi.

Ground transportation
Ground transportation to and from the airport includes on-airport car rental, taxis, shuttles, and limousines.

Airlines and destinations
Southwest Airlines began service in May 2010 with eight daily Boeing 737 flights, two each to Baltimore-Washington (BWI), Houston–Hobby (HOU), Nashville (BNA), and Orlando (MCO).
Southwest Airlines then started daily seasonal nonstop service to St. Louis (STL) on June 3, 2012.

Effective in early March 2016, Delta Air Lines was operating up to six nonstop flights a day to Atlanta (ATL) operated with Boeing 717, McDonnell Douglas MD-88 and McDonnell Douglas MD-90 jetliners. Delta has also operated Boeing 737 jets into the airport in the past. Delta Connection had operated regional jet aircraft on their flights to Atlanta but currently does not serve the airport. According to FlightAware, Delta currently operates Airbus A320 and Boeing 717 jetliners on its mainline service between the airport and Atlanta.

United Express utilizes Mesa Airlines and CommutAir regional jets on their nonstop flights to George Bush Intercontinental Airport (IAH). Seasonally, flights are operated by Air Wisconsin to O'Hare International Airport.

On January 18, 2018, Northwest Florida Beaches International Airport announced the beginning of American Airlines nonstop flights to Charlotte Douglas (CLT) and Dallas/Fort Worth (DFW), which commenced on June 7, 2018. There are two flights per day to both destinations operated by American Eagle regional carriers PSA Airlines and Mesa Airlines, respectively with regional jets.

Passenger

Scheduled nonstop passenger flights include:

Statistics

Cargo airlines

References

External links

 Northwest Florida Beaches International Airport, official site
 
 

Airports in Florida
Transportation buildings and structures in Bay County, Florida
2010 establishments in Florida
Airports established in 2010
Panama City, Florida